The Downtowner Motor Inn is a historic motel on Central Avenue (former U.S. Route 66) in Downtown Albuquerque, New Mexico. Opened in 1965, it was originally part of the Downtowner chain, which operated economy-priced motels in city centers across the U.S. In 1972, the motel was sold and became a Quality Inn. It has also operated as a Ramada and most recently as the Hotel Blue, which closed in 2017. In 2020, it was announced that the motel would be renovated by the Los Angeles-based ARRIVE Hotels & Restaurants to reopen in 2022. These plans were delayed by the COVID-19 pandemic, and ARRIVE Hotels was purchased by a different hotel company, Palisociety, in 2021. Renovation work began in early 2022.

The building was listed on the National Register of Historic Places in 2020 as "an exceptional example of a mid-20th-century motel on Route 66 in Albuquerque."

The motel was designed by James L. Burke of the Memphis, Tennessee-based firm of Burke & Beaty Architects. It is a six-story building of reinforced concrete construction and is an example of International Style architecture with an emphasis on simple rectangular forms. It has 145 rooms, which are accessed in typical motel fashion via open-air exterior walkways with metal railings rather than a central lobby. Elevators are located in a breezeway near the center of each floor. The ground floor has scalloped concrete portes-cochères on the south and west elevations, facing Central Avenue and 8th Street, respectively. The south elevation includes stylized Southwestern symbols cast into the exterior concrete panels, which was unusual for International Style architecture. These elements have been obscured and damaged by new exterior trim which was glued onto the panels during a 2007–08 remodeling. ARRIVE Hotels reportedly planned to restore the exterior of the building closer to its original appearance.

See also
Hill Wheatley Downtowner Motor Inn, another NRHP-listed Downtowner Motor Inn in Hot Springs, Arkansas

References

Hotels in Albuquerque, New Mexico
Hotel buildings on the National Register of Historic Places in New Mexico
New Mexico State Register of Cultural Properties
National Register of Historic Places in Albuquerque, New Mexico
Hotel buildings completed in 1965
Motels in the United States
U.S. Route 66 in New Mexico